The Wulff series of dry flies evolved from a dry fly style conceived by angler Lee Wulff in the 1930s.

Origin
In 1930, Lee Wulff designed three innovative dry flies to fish with on the Esopus and other Catskill rivers. He called the flies the Ausable Gray, Coffin May and Bucktail Coachman. They were high floating, full bodied flies with hair wings and tails. They proved exceptionally effective for trout and salmon in fast rivers. At the time, he was fishing regularly with Dan Bailey, a science teacher at Brooklyn Polytechnic. Both men were tying and selling flies in their spare time to supplement their incomes. Wulff considered the traditional English and Catskill style dry flies that were the staple of the fly trade were far too skinny and "anemic" to be effective for American trout thus he created this stocky, robust style of fly. Angling author Joseph D. Bates Jr. in his seminal work on Atlantic Salmon Flies and Fishing (1970) credits Wulff with "establishing a distinct American style of dry fly."

He collaborated with Dan Bailey during the development of the patterns and Bailey encouraged him to rename the flies. The original Ausable Gray, Coffin May and Bucktail Coachman became the Grey Wulff, White Wulff and Royal Wulff. Three additional patterns were created by the end of 1930, the Blonde Wulff, Brown Wulff and Black Wulff. The series would gain prominence after Wulff introduced them to Ray Bergman, another fly angler and outdoor writer who became the Fishing editor for Outdoor Life magazine. Bergman embraced the flies and included them his two editions of Trout (1938, 1952).

Wulff considered the pattern somewhat generic and encouraged variation and evolution of the pattern instead of rigid adherence to a precise recipe. Dan Bailey, who fished regularly in Montana and eventually established a fly shop and mail order business in Livingston, Montana in 1938 promoted the series extensively to western fly anglers. The Wulff flies, especially the Royal Wulff, are still a staple in angler's fly boxes around the world. Angler and writer John Gierach believes the Royal Wulff is one of the most popular dry patterns over the last half century.

Imitates
Originally tied to imitate large mayflies, the Wulff style flies are also useful to imitate adult grasshoppers and other large terrestrial insects.

Materials
 Hook-dry fly hook (size 8-18)
 Thread-color matching specific Wulff pattern
 Hackle-dry fly hackle matching specific Wulff pattern
 Tail-Bucktail, deer or moose hair, calf tail tied full
 Body-wool, fur or synthetic dubbing color matching specific Wulff pattern
 Wing-Bucktail, deer hair, calf tail

Variations
As described by Dave Hughes in Trout Flies-The Tier's Reference unless attributed otherwise.
 Adams Wulff - patterned after the Adams (dry fly) with a gray muskrat fur body and mixed grizzly and brown hackle
 Ausable Wulff - distinguished by a rusty orange fur body, white wings and mixed grizzly and brown hackle
 Black Wulff - distinguished by a pink fur body, black wings and furnace hackle
 Blonde Wulff - distinguished by a tan fur body, light colored tail and wings, ginger hackle
 Brown Wulff
 Brown Drake Wulff - variations attributed to Dan Bailey (1960s), Mike Lawson (1970s) and Bruce Staples (1990s)
 Gray Wulff - distinguished by dark brown body fur, wings and medium dun hackle
 Green Drake Wulff - attributed to Bob Jacklin, light olive body, grizzly died yellow hackle
 Grizzly Wulff - distinguished by a yellow floss or fur body, brown wings and tail and mixed brown and grizzly hackle
 Montana Wulff - attributed to Allen Knox (1960s)
 Royal Wulff - a Wulff style derived from the Royal Coachman
 Were Wulff - attributed to Gary LaFontaine body of hare's ear dubbing
 White Wulff
 Wolf Wulff - attributed to LeRoy Cook (1978), distinguished by a body, wing and tail of wolf fur and hair.

Notes

 
Dry fly patterns